Robert Wayne Kipper (born July 8, 1964) is an American professional baseball coach and a former Major League Baseball (MLB) pitcher. He has also spent two terms (all of the 2002 season, and part of the 2015 season) as bullpen coach of MLB's Boston Red Sox.

Playing career
After graduating from Aurora Central Catholic High School, he was selected by the California Angels with the eighth pick in the first round of the 1982 Major League Baseball Draft. He had signed to play baseball at Nebraska before his selection. Kipper led the Class A California League in wins (18) and earned run average (2.04) as his league's "pitcher of the year" in 1984. He made his MLB debut with the Angels in April  at age 20, but was ineffective in two games pitched and was returned to the minor leagues.

Kipper was sent from the Angels to the Pirates on August 16, 1985 to complete a trade from two weeks prior on August 2 that also had Pat Clements and Mike Brown coming to Pittsburgh for John Candelaria, George Hendrick and Al Holland.

In his eight-season MLB career, Kipper posted a 27–37 record with a 4.43 ERA and 11 saves in 271 appearances. He allowed 527 hits and 217 bases on balls, with 369 strikeouts, and 562 innings pitched.

Post-playing career
Following his playing retirement, Kipper has worked as a pitching coach in independent league baseball and in the minor leagues. He also spent a full season as  major league bullpen coach of the 2002 Boston Red Sox. Thirteen years later, on August 16, 2015, he was named Boston's interim bullpen coach, part of a chain reaction of moves driven by manager John Farrell's medical leave of absence for treatment of lymphoma.  In Farrell's absence, bench coach Torey Lovullo became acting manager and bullpen coach Dana LeVangie became acting bench coach.

A member of the Boston Red Sox organization since 1999, Kipper has coached for their Lowell Spinners (1999), Augusta GreenJackets (2000–01), Greenville Drive (2005–06; 2008–09; 2018–present), Lancaster JetHawks (2007), Portland Sea Dogs (2003–04; 2010–14), and Pawtucket Red Sox (2015–17) affiliates, working with teams from short-season leagues to Triple-A.

References

External links
, or MLB, or Pura Pelota (Venezuelan Winter League)

1964 births
Living people
American expatriate baseball players in Canada
Baseball coaches from Illinois
Baseball players from Illinois
Boston Red Sox coaches
Buffalo Bisons (minor league) players
California Angels players
Edmonton Trappers players
Hawaii Islanders players
Major League Baseball bullpen coaches
Major League Baseball pitchers
Midland Angels players
Minnesota Twins players
Minor league baseball coaches
Nashua Pirates players
Navegantes del Magallanes players
American expatriate baseball players in Venezuela
Norfolk Tides players
Peoria Suns players
Pittsburgh Pirates players
Redwood Pioneers players
Salem Angels players
Sportspeople from Aurora, Illinois
Vancouver Canadians players